The Rowland Institute at Harvard, formerly the Rowland Institute for Science was founded by Edwin H. Land, founder of Polaroid Corporation, as a nonprofit, privately endowed basic research organization in 1980. The institute merged with Harvard University on July 1, 2002. The Rowland Institute is dedicated to experimental science across a wide range of disciplines. Research subjects at the institute includes chemistry, physics and biology, and focus on interdisciplinary work and the development of new experimental tools. It is located on the Charles River near Kendall Square in Cambridge, Massachusetts, and is a few miles away from the main campus of Harvard.

Rowland Fellows
The flagship program at the Rowland Institute is the Fellows Program. The program supports early career experimental scientists. Rowland Fellows receive funding for salary and research expenses and are allocated their own laboratory space. The Rowland Institute also provides technical support from permanent expert staff. The Fellowship lasts for five years, with continuation past two years contingent on a favorable internal review.

Notable members and alumni
Howard Berg - biophysicist noted for his work on the motility of the bacterium Escherichia coli (E. coli)
Steven Block - pioneered the use of optical tweezers to study step dynamics of kinesin and RNA polymerase on DNA templates
Colleen Cavanaugh - microbiologist recognized for her studies of hydrothermal vent ecosystems
Donald A. Glaser - physicist, neurobiologist, and winner of the 1960 Nobel Prize in Physics for inventing the bubble chamber
Jene Golovchenko - physicist noted for his work on materials for whole genome sequencing
Lene Hau - physicist noted for her work on Bose–Einstein condensate, and ultracold atomic system optics
Winfield Hill - co-authored the popular text The Art of Electronics with Harvard Physicist Paul Horowitz

Past Directors
Edwin H. Land: 1980 - 1992
Phil Dubois: 1992 - 1997
Michael Burns: 1998 - 2002
Frans Spaepen: 2002 - 2013
Cynthia Friend: 2013 - 2019
Andrew Murray: 2020–present

References 

Harvard University research institutes
Multidisciplinary research institutes
Research institutes in Massachusetts
Scientific organizations
Science and technology studies associations
Research institutes established in 1980
1980 establishments in Massachusetts